List of United States Naval reactors is a comprehensive list of all naval reactors designed, built, or used by the United States Navy.

Reactor designations 

Each nuclear reactor design is given a three-character designation consisting of a letter representing the type of ship the reactor is intended for, a consecutive generation number, and a letter indicating the reactor's designer.

Ship types:
 "A" – aircraft carrier
 "C" – cruiser
 "D" – destroyer
 "S" – submarine

Contracted designers:
 "B" – Bechtel
 "C" – Combustion Engineering
 "G" – General Electric
 "W" – Westinghouse

Nuclear reactors of the United States Navy 

Naval reactors of the United States Navy, listed alphabetically by ship type.

Aircraft carrier reactors 

 A1W reactor
 land-based prototype for USS Enterprise (CVN-65); located at Naval Reactors Facility
 A2W reactor
 
 A3W reactor
 A4W reactor
 s
 A1B reactor
 s

Cruiser reactors 

 C1W reactor
 Long Beach-class cruiser

Destroyer reactors 

 D1G reactor
 land-based prototype for Bainbridge-class cruiser; located at the Kesselring site
 D2G reactor
 Bainbridge-class cruiser
 Truxtun-class cruiser
 California-class cruiser
 Virginia-class cruiser

Submarine reactors 
 NR-1 reactor
 one-of-a-kind reactor built for the U.S. Navy research submarine NR-1
 S1C reactor
 land-based prototype for USS Tullibee (SSN-597); located at Windsor, Connecticut
 S1G reactor
 land-based prototype for USS Seawolf (SSN-575); located at Kesselring site
 S1W reactor
 land-based prototype for USS Nautilus (SSN-571); located at Naval Reactors Facility
 S2C reactor
 
 S2G reactor
 
 S2W reactor
 
 S2Wa reactor
 replacement reactor for USS Seawolf (SSN-575)
 S3G reactor
 land-based prototype for USS Triton (SSN-586); located at Kesselring site
 S3W reactor
 
 
 
 S4G reactor
 
 S4W reactor
 
 
 S5G reactor
 A land-based prototype located at Naval Reactors Facility, and
 
 S5W reactor
 Skipjack-class submarine (SSN-585 class)
 George Washington-class submarine (SSBN-598 class)
 Thresher/Permit-class submarine (SSN-593/SSN-594 class)
 Ethan Allen-class submarine (SSBN-608 class)
 Lafayette-class submarine (SSBN-616 class)
 James Madison-class submarine (SSBN-627 class)
 Benjamin Franklin-class submarine (SSBN-640 class)
 Sturgeon-class submarine (SSN-637 class)
 
 
 S6G reactor
 Los Angeles-class submarine (SSN-688 class)
 S6W reactor
 Seawolf-class submarine (SSN-21 class)
 S7G reactor
 land-based prototype (Modifications and Additions to a Reactor Facility or "MARF") located at the Kesselring site
 S8G reactor
 s (SSBN-726 class)
 S9G reactor
 Virginia-class submarine (SSN-774 class)
 S1B reactor
 Columbia-class submarine (SSBN-826 class)

See also 
 List of commercial nuclear reactors
 Nuclear marine propulsion
 United States Naval reactor
 Rolls-Royce PWR – United Kingdom's naval reactors
 Soviet naval reactors

References 
 US Navy Propulsion Systems – Federation of American Scientists
 Nuclear Attack Submarines – CombatIndex.com

Reactors
United States Naval reactors